Khan Laq (also Romanized as Khān Laq and Khanlog) is a village in Ziarat Rural District, in the Central District of Shirvan County, North Khorasan Province, Iran. At the 2006 census, its population was 4,905, in 1,138 families.

References 

Populated places in Shirvan County